Theodore Roosevelt "Ted" Aranda (1934 – July 2022) was a Belizean politician and Garifuna activist.

Education and UDP career 

Aranda held an M.A. (1967) and a Ph.D. (1971) in Education from the University of Illinois Urbana-Champaign.  He worked with the Belizean branch of the CARE organization. In 1974, he joined the newly formed United Democratic Party and quickly rose up the ranks. In 1979, he was one of the five representatives elected for the UDP, representing the Dangriga constituency. He was elected UDP leader as the previous leader, Dean Lindo, was defeated for re-election in the Fort George constituency. After a stormy stint as the country's first post-independence Leader of the Opposition, Aranda was either ousted or resigned from the UDP leadership in late 1982, leaving the party entirely shortly thereafter.

Christian Democratic Party and move to the PUP 

Aranda briefly revived the Christian Democratic Party in 1983 and unsuccessfully sought re-election in Dangriga under its banner in 1984, finishing third with 24.3 percent of the vote. He went on to join the People's United Party and re-captured the Dangriga seat as its candidate in 1989. Russell "Chiste" Garcia defeated him for the seat in 1993, but Aranda won a third non-consecutive term in 1998. He was not a candidate for re-election in 2003. Since Belize's 1981 independence from Great Britain Aranda was the only person to win election to the Belize House as a candidate for both the UDP and the PUP.

World Garifuna Organization 

In 2000, Aranda formed the World Garifuna Organization, a body claiming to represent Garinagu across the world and in Belize, though the official Belizean body is the National Garifuna Council. 

Aranda had been at odds with younger members of the Garinagu population.

Death

He died in July 2022.

References

External links 

 Evan X Hyde on Aranda's influence

1934 births
2022 deaths
People from Dangriga
Garifuna people
People's United Party politicians
Christian Democratic Party (Belize) politicians
United Democratic Party (Belize) politicians
Government ministers of Belize
Members of the Belize House of Representatives for Dangriga
University of Illinois Urbana-Champaign alumni